is a former Japanese actor born in Kagoshima Prefecture. He is 180 cm tall and weighs 62 kg. He specializes in Shorinji Kempo.

Ohkuchi is best known for playing Emperor Z, the main villain of the Tokusatsu series Ressha Sentai ToQger. He also portrayed Sōsuke Aizen in the Rock Musical BLEACH series, and he briefly played the role of Kunimitsu Tezuka in Tenimyu, the Prince of Tennis musical series, in the More Than Limit: St. Rudolph Gakuen musical. In August 2016, Ohkuchi announced his retirement as an actor.

Filmography

Television
 (2003 ANB)
 (2003 CX)
Kamen Rider 555 (2003) - Kazufumi Mizuno
Umizaru (2005 CX)
Engine (2005 CX)
Mito Kōmon (2005 TBS) (Part 34 Episode 15)
 (2006 NTV)
 (2008 EX)
 (2008 TX)
Here Is Greenwood (2008 MX)
 (2008 MX)
Smile (2009 TBS)
 (2009 CX)
 (2009 MBS)
Ressha Sentai ToQger (2014) - Emperor Z

Film
 (2004)
 (2004)
Umizaru (2004), Gunji Kensuke
AOGRA (2006), Takashiro Shingo
Sakugoe (2007), Yasuda
Crows Zero 2 (2009), Rikiya Kumagiri

Theatre
The Prince of Tennis Musical: More Than Limit St. Rudolph Gakuen - Kunimitsu Tezuka (2004)
Rock Musical BLEACH series (as Sōsuke Aizen)
Rock Musical BLEACH (August 2005)
Rock Musical BLEACH Saien (January 2006)
Rock Musical BLEACH The Dark of the Bleeding Moon (August 2006)
Rock Musical BLEACH Live Bankai Show Code 001 (January 2007)
Rock Musical BLEACH No Clouds in the Blue Heaven (March - April 2007)
Rock Musical BLEACH Live Bankai Show Code 002 (2008)

TV Commercials / Advertisements
CASIO　携帯電話

References

External links
Kengo Ohkuchi official website
TFL.org Approved Fanlisting
Official Blog

1981 births
Living people
Japanese male actors